Logical Investigations (German: Logische Untersuchungen) can refer to:

Logical Investigations (Trendelenburg), 1840 work by Friedrich Adolf Trendelenburg
Logical Investigations (Husserl), 1900–1901 work by Edmund Husserl
Logical Investigations (Frege), 1918–1923 work by Gottlob Frege

See also
Investigations into Logical Deduction (Untersuchungen über das logische Schließen), 1934/5 works by Gerhard Gentzen